Alfred Lerner College of Business and Economics is a School of Business at the University of Delaware. 
The school was named after Alfred Lerner, formerly the chairman of MBNA, one of the largest credit card issuers in the world before being bought out by Bank of America.

History 
Business education began at the University of Delaware in the early 20th century, with the undergraduate business major established in 1917. The 1950s saw the establishment of the accounting club and MBA program. The 1960s was a period of much development for the business program. In 1962, economics professor Ruben Austin is appointed as the first dean and the business and economics programs were organized into a separate school the following year. The undergraduate and graduate programs were accredited by the AACSB in 1966 and 1982 respectively.

Programs of study 
Students may choose a program in one of the five departments: 
Accounting & Management Information Systems (MIS)
Business Administration
Economics
Finance 
Hospitality and Sport Business Management 
There are also interdisciplinary programs such as International Business and Global Enterprise Technology (GET).

At graduate level, the traditional MBA program (both part-time and full-time) is offered in addition to MS and MA degrees. There are two Doctor of Philosophy (PhD) programs available: Economics and Financial Services Analytics (FSA)

References

External links 
 

Business schools in Delaware
University of Delaware

1963 establishments in Delaware
Educational institutions established in 1963